Himachal Pradesh Congress Committee (HPCC) is the unit of the Indian National Congress, working in the state of Himachal Pradesh. Congress leader Y. S. Parmar, Ram Lal Thakur and Virbhadra Singh from Congress represented the state since 1951. Its head office is situated at Rajiv Bhawan in Shimla. Pratibha Singh is the current president.

List of presidents

List of chief ministers of Himachal Pradesh from Indian National Congress(1963–present) 
In 1963, Himachal Pradesh, though being a Union Territory, was provided with a Legislative Assembly. The Territorial Council was converted into the Legislative Assembly of the Union Territory. The assembly has its first sitting on 1 October 1971. On 18 December 1970 the State of Himachal Pradesh Act was passed by Parliament and the new state came into being on 25 January 1971 as the 18th state of the Indian Union.

List of Current Members of the Himachal Legislative Assembly

List of Current Members of Lok Sabha

List of all Rajya Sabha members of Himachal Pradesh from Indian National Congress

Timeline

Himachal Pradesh Legislative Assembly election

See also 
Indian National Congress
 Congress Working Committee
 All India Congress Committee
 Pradesh Congress Committee

Notes

References

External links
 

Political parties in Himachal Pradesh
Politics of Himachal Pradesh
Indian National Congress by state or union territory